The orange-breasted fig parrot has been split into three species:
 Blue-fronted fig parrot, Cyclopsitta gulielmitertii
 Black-fronted fig parrot, Cyclopsitta nigrifrons
 Dusky-cheeked fig parrot, Cyclopsitta melanogenia

Birds by common name